Solar Cruiser is a planned NASA spacecraft that will study the Sun while propelled by a solar sail. The mission will support NASA's Solar Terrestrial Probes program by studying how interplanetary space changes in response to the constant outpouring of energy and particles from the Sun and how it interacts with planetary atmospheres. It is currently planned to launch in February 2025.

The principal investigator is Les Johnson at NASA's Marshall Space Flight Center in Huntsville, Alabama.

Overview 
The mission was selected for launch, riding with NASA's Interstellar Mapping and Acceleration Probe (IMAP) and Global Lyman-alpha Imagers of the Dynamic Exosphere (GLIDE). The Solar Cruiser spacecraft will demonstrate solar sailing around the Sun at an unusual polar orbit, while its coronagraph instrument would enable simultaneous measurements of the Sun's magnetic field structure and velocity of coronal mass ejections. The craft's nearly  solar sail will demonstrate the ability to use solar radiation as propulsion and facilitate views of the Sun not easily accessible with current technology, such as a close-up view of its poles.

Solar Cruiser was awarded US$65 million for mission execution. Previously, US$400,000 for nine-month mission concept studies was presented to the Heliophysics Solar Terrestrial Probes program, which is managed by NASA's Goddard Space Flight Center in Greenbelt, Maryland.

References 

Solar sail spacecraft
Sun
Space weather
Proposed spacecraft
2025 in spaceflight